Dato' Sri Mohd Johari bin Baharum (born 13 April 1954) is a Malaysian politician and was a three-term Member of the Parliament of Malaysia for the Kubang Pasu constituency in Kedah, Malaysia from 2004 to 2018. He was elected to Parliament at the 2004 election, replacing former fourth Prime Minister Mahathir Mohamad, who was retiring then. Mohd Johari is a member of United Malays National Organisation (UMNO) party, a component party of the previous governing Barisan Nasional coalition.

In the 2018 election, Johari lost to Amiruddin Hamzah, of the Malaysian United Indigenous Party (PPBM), in a three-corner fight with Norhafiza Fadzil of Pan-Malaysian Islamic Party (PAS) for the Kubang Pasu parliamentary seat.

Until 2018 election before the downfall of BN as the ruling federal government and his failure in retaining his parliamentary seat, he was a deputy minister in the federal Cabinet.

Election results

Honours
 :
 Knight Commander of the Glorious Order of the Crown of Kedah (D.G.M.K.) – Dato' Wira (2008)
 :
 Grand Knight of the Order of Sultan Ahmad Shah of Pahang (S.S.A.P.) – Dato' Sri (2015)

References

Living people
1954 births
People from Johor
Malaysian people of Malay descent
Malaysian Muslims
United Malays National Organisation politicians
Members of the Dewan Rakyat
21st-century Malaysian politicians